The old Vejle Municipality existed from 1970-2006.
The municipality covered an area of 144 km², and had a total population of 56,104 (2005).

In 2007 it was merged with other municipalities to form the new Vejle Municipality.

Former municipalities of Denmark
1970 establishments in Denmark
2006 disestablishments in Denmark